The Runaways is a 1975 American made-for-television drama film directed by Harry Harris. Starring Dorothy McGuire, Van Williams, and Josh Albee, it follows a teenage boy and an escaped leopard.  It first aired on the CBS network on April 1, 1975.

It was the most viewed primetime program in the United States for the week when it debuted in April 1975.

The movie was adapted from a 1972 novel of the same name by British author Victor Canning.  It was adapted for television by John McGreevey, one of the writers for The Waltons.

The film was originally intended to be two hours in length, but was trimmed down to 90 minutes, which created some gaps in the storytelling.  The leopard used in the film was named Spot, and a jaguar named Clyde used for the running scenes.

The film was released on VHS in 1986.

References

External links 
 
 Film on YouTube

1975 television films
1975 films
1975 drama films
American drama films
Films about cats
Teen adventure films
Films based on British novels
CBS network films
1970s American films